Eucalyptus stowardii, commonly known as fluted-horn mallee, is a species of mallee that is endemic to the south-west of Western Australia. It has smooth bark, lance-shaped adult leaves, flower buds in groups of seven, creamy white flowers and ribbed, cylindrical to cup-shaped fruit.

Description
It has smooth grey bark on the trunk and branches. Flowering occurs between June and November and the flowers are creamy white.

Taxonomy and naming
Eucalyptus stowardii was first formally described in 1917 by Joseph Maiden in the Journal and Proceedings of the Royal Society of New South Wales from specimens collected near Kellerberrin by Frederick Stoward. The specific epithet honours the collector of the type specimens.

Distribution and habitat
The fluted-horn mallee is found on stony rises, limestone hills and road verges between Dowerin, Carnamah and Wubin in the central northern Wheatbelt region of Western Australia, where it grows in open shrubland in gravelly sand-loam soils.

Conservation status
This mallee is classified as "not threatened" by the Western Australian Government Department of Parks and Wildlife.

See also
List of Eucalyptus species

References

Eucalypts of Western Australia
stowardii
Myrtales of Australia
Plants described in 1917
Taxa named by Joseph Maiden